Shaheed Benazirabad District previously known as Nawabshah District, is one of the districts in the province of Sindh, Pakistan.

Renaming 
The district was renamed in September 2008 when most of MPAs of Nawabshah demanded the district be renamed to honour the late party leader.

The renaming of the district was criticised by the family of Syed Nawabshah and others who, while saddened at the death of Bhutto, felt that Nawabshah was a historic district and ought to have kept its name.

History
At the establishment of the district in 1 November 1912, seven talukas were included in this district:
 Kandiaro
 Naushero Feroze
 Moro
 Sakrand
 Nawabshah
 Sinjhoro
 Shahdadpur

The district was divided into two Sub-divisions, namely Nawabshah Sub-division and Naushahro Feroze Sub-division.  The former comprised the three talukas Shahdadpur, Sinjhoro and Nawabshah, while the later comprise the four talukas of Kandiaro, Naushahro Feroze, Moro and Sakrand.

In 1953 the talukas of Shahdadpur and Sinjhoro became part of the newly established Sanghar District.  This left Nawabshah Sub-division with only one taluka, so Sakrand taluka was moved from Naushahro Feroze Sub-division to Nawabshah Sub-division.  In 1989, another part of the district, the talukas of Nausehro Feroz, Kandiaro and half of the taluka of Moro, was cleaved from it to form the new Naushahro Feroze District. A new taluka, Daulatpur, was created, from half of the Moro and some of Sakrand taluka in Nawabshah district. The district then contained three talukas:
 Nawabshah
 Sakrand
 Daulatpur

In 2005, after the local government election, a new taluka named Daur was cleaved from Nawabshah taluka and Daulatpur taluka renamed to Kazi Ahmed.

The district then comprised four talukas:
 Nawabshah
 Sakrand
 Daulatpur (now Kazi Ahmed)
 Daur

In May 2014, a 5.0 magnitude earthquake struck the district, killing one person and injuring 70.

Administrative subdivisions
Shaheed Benazir Abad formerly Nawabshah District. The Deputy Commissioner is responsible for overall administration of the district. The district is sub-divided into four Tehsils:
Sakrand
 Nawabshah
 Qazi Ahmed
Daur

Demographics
At the time of the 2017 census, Shaheed Benazirabad district had a population of 1,613,506, of which 833,235 were males and 780,089 females. The rural population was 1,123,696 (69.64%) and urban 489,810 (30.36%). The literacy rate is 46.86%: 59.42% for males and 33.85% for females.

The majority religion is Islam, with 95.82% of the population. Hinduism (including those from Scheduled Castes) is practiced by 3.86% of the population.

At the time of the 2017 census, 82.70% of the population spoke Sindhi, 6.86% Urdu, 5.61% Punjabi, 1.57% Brahui and 1.40% Balochi as their first language.

Education 
District Shaheed Benazirabad is ranked at the 125th position in the education score index of the Pakistan District Education Rankings 2017 published by Alif Ailaan.

Low learning outcome issues remain a hindrance for district Shaheed Benazirabad. Issues reported by the residents via the Taleem Do! App complain of the lack of primary schools in the area. The debate on whether basic education should be provided in the regional, national or official languages has been a point of debate in Pakistan for several years.

Events

The H. M. Khoja Annual Flower Show was introduced by H. M. Khoja in 1954 at Khoja Garden. The celebrations take place for three or four days.

Major educational institutes 

Educational institutions in district Benazirabad include:
 Quaid-e-Awam University of Engineering, Science and Technology
 Shaheed Benazir Bhutto University
 Shaheed Benazir Bhutto University of Veterinary and Animal Sciences, Sakrand
 Peoples University of Medical and Health Sciences
 Provincial Institute Of Teacher Education (PITE) Sindh, Nawabshah
 Bilawal Research and Historical Institute Nawabshah
 Govt Habib College of Technology Nawabshah
 Quaid-e-Azam Law College Nawabshah
 The Loin's College of Law Nawabshah (Private)
 Bakhtawar Cadet College for Girls
 Nawabshah Homoeopathic Medical College,0241-61718
 Nawabshah Institute Of Medical And Health Sciences (NIMHS), Nawab Shah
 College of Physicians and Surgeons Pakistan Nawabshah
 Govt. Sachal Sarmast College, Nawabshah
 Quaid-E-Azam Rangers Public School & College Nawabshah
 CENTRAL COTTON RESEARCH INSTITUTE NAWABSHAH (1976) (Sakrand)
 Govt. Degree (Boys) College Nawabshah 
 Govt. Degree (Girls) College Nawabshah
 Govt: Girls College Nawabshah 
 Govt. Science College Nawabshah 
 Bhittai (Private) Institute of Nursing Nawabshah
 Piot (Private) College Nawabshah 
 Imperial (Private) Science College Nawabshah
 Crown (Private) College of Commerce Nawabshah
INDUS Institute of Science and Technology Nawabshah

CENTRAL WHEAT RESEARCH INSTITUTE NAWABSHAH (1978)

Govt Degree (Boys)  College Sakrand 
Govt Degree (Girls) College Sakrand 
Govt Degree College Daulatpur 
Govt Girls College Daulatpur 
 Asad public college shahpur jahania
Govt Degree College Daur 
 Govt Degree (Boys) College Kazi Ahmed 
 Govt Degree (Girls) College Kazi Ahmed

Union Councils 
There are 58 Union Councils in Shaheed Benazirabad District:
Union Councils are given below:

List of Dehs
The following is a list of Dadu District's 351 dehs, organised by taluka:

 Nawabshah taluka (51 dehs)
 86-Nasrat
 87-Nasrat
 87-A Nasrat
 88 Nasrat
 89 Nasrat
 90-Nasrat
 91-Nasrat
 102-Nasrat
 103-Nasrat
 104-Nasrat
 6-Dad
 8-Dad
 13-Dad
 14-Dad
 15-Dad
 16-Dad
 17-Dad
 18-Dad
 19-Dad
 20-Dad
 21-Dad
 22-Dad
 23-Dad
 24-Dad
 25-Dad
 26-Dad
 27-Dad
 28-Dad
 29-Dad
 30-Dad
 31-Dad
 32-Dad
 33-Dad
 34-Dad
 35-Dad
 36-Dad
 37-Dad
 38-Dad
 39-Dad
 40-Dad
 41-Dad
 42-Dad
 43-Dad
 44-Dad
 46-Dad
 47-Dad
 48-Dad
 49-Dad
 50-Dad
 Khiyaroon
 Lakhmir
 Daur taluka (169 dehs)
 01-Dad
 2-Dad
 3-Dad
 3-A Dad
 4-Dad
 4-A Dad
 5-Dad
 7-Dad
 09-Dad
 10-Dad
 11-Dad
 12-Dad
 1-Nasrat
 2-Nasrat
 3-Nasrat
 4-Nasrat
 5-Nasrat
 6-Nasrat
 07-Nasrat
 08-Nasrat
 09-Nasrat
 10-Nasrat
 11-Nasrat
 12-Nasrat
 12-A Nasrat
 13 Nasrat
 14-Nasrat
 15-Nasrat
 16-Nasrat
 17-Nasrat
 18-Nasrat
 19-Nasrat
 20-Nasrat
 21-Nasrat
 22-Nasrat
 23-Nasrat
 24-Nasrat
 25-Nasrat
 26-Nasrat
 26-A Nasrat
 27-Nasrat
 28-Nasrat
 29-Nasrat
 30-Nasrat
 31-Nasrat
 32-Nasrat
 33-Nasrat
 34-Nasrat
 35-Nasrat
 36-Nasrat
 37-Nasrat
 38-Nasrat
 39-Nasrat
 40-Nasrat
 41-Nasrat
 42-Nasrat
 43-Nasrat
 44-Nasrat
 45-Nasrat
 46-Nasrat
 47-Nasrat
 48-Nasrat
 49-Nasrat
 50-Nasrat
 51-Nasrat
 52-Nasrat
 53-Nasrat
 54-Nasrat
 55-Nasrat
 56-Nasrat
 57-Nasrat
 58-Nasrat
 59-Nasrat
 60-Nasrat
 61-Nasrat
 62-Nasrat
 63-Nasrat
 64-Nasrat
 65-Nasrat
 66-Nasrat
 67-Nasrat
 68-Nasrat
 69-Nasrat
 70-Nasrat
 71-Nasrat
 72-Nasrat
 72-A Nasrat
 73-Nasrat
 74-Nasrat
 75-Nasrat
 76-Nasrat
 77-Nasrat
 78-Nasrat
 79-Nasrat
 80-Nasrat
 81-Nasrat
 82-Nasrat
 83-Nasrat
 84-Nasrat
 85-Nasrat
 92-Nasrat
 93-Nasrat
 94-Nasrat
 95-Nasrat
 96-Nasrat
 97-Nasrat
 98-Nasrat
 99-Nasrat
 100-Nasrat
 101-Nasrat
 105-Nasrat
 105-A Nasrat
 106-Nasrat
 107-Nasrat
 108-Nasrat
 109-Nasrat
 110-Nasrat
 111-Nasrat
 112-Nasrat
 113-Nasrat
 114-Nasrat
 115-Nasrat
 116-Nasrat
 117-Nasrat
 Akro
 Akro-2
 Akro-3
 Akro-4
 Akro-5
 Akro-5/A
 Akro-6
 Akro-7
 Akro-8
 Akro-9
 Amerji
 Chack-2
 Chack-3
 Chack-4
 Chack-5
 Chack-6
 Chack 1to11 Suhelo
 Chack 1to6 O/Sawri
 Chhan Babu
 G.A. Dago
 G.A. Daur
 G.A. Makhand
 Gojro
 Goongothar
 Gujhro
 Gupchani
 Jhemal
 Jhip
 Kalri
 Mari Sabhar
 Obhari Amerji Chak-2
 Obhari Amerji Chak-3
 Obhari Sawari
 Obhari Sawari
 Obhari Sawari
 Obhari Sawari
 Obhari Sawari
 Panjo Chan
 Shah Hussain
 Suhelo Chack-2
 Suhelo Chack-3
 Suhelo Chack-4
 Suhelo Chack-5
 Suhelo Chack-6
 Qazi Ahmed taluka (65 dehs)
 Abad Makkhand
 Ahmed Bughio
 Allah Khai
 Amerji
 Bambhai
 Bambhai Jagir
 Bet Safan
 Bhellaro
 Bogri
 Charioro
 Daulatpur
 Deran
 Dim
 Drigh
 Gair Abad Makhand
 Haberi
 Hothepota
 Jari
 Jarkhoyaro Jagir
 Jarkhoyaro Rayati
 Jugpal
 Junjhan
 Kaka
 Kandhari
 Kacho That
 Keti Hassan Shah
 Khambro
 Khar
 Khariro
 Kharjani
 Kundah Nandho
 Kundah Wado
 Kungo
 Kunro
 Malwah
 Manharo
 Mehrab Wai
 Mehraro
 Mir Mohammad Juno
 Mir Rukan
 Mirza Bagh
 Mirzapur Jagir-1
 Mirzapur Jagir-2
 Noor Muhammad
 Olahi Amerhi
 Padd
 Pat Peeral
 Phulel
 Pubjo
 Qazi Ahmed
 Raja Wah
 Re-Hothepota
 Saeed Kandho
 Sarman Kandi
 Sawari
 Seendhal Kamal
 Seerchja
 Shahpur
 Sukhpur
 Sun
 Talhi
 That Jagir-1
 That Jagir-2
 That Rayati
 Utar Sawari
 Sakrand taluka (64 dehs)
 1-Rain Boobak
 2-Sukhio Manahijo
 3-Samo Rahu
 4-Bachal Rahu
 5-Sobho Lund
 6-Marvi
 7-Darri
 8-Ikhraj
 9-Noor Bhoora
 10-Bhoora
 11-Rahib Shah
 12-Mehrabpur
 13-Marri
 14-Ladho Chandio
 15-Fatih Pur
 16-Jam Jodho
 17-Fareed Keerio
 18-Sakranad
 19-Jalalani
 20-Bhutta
 21-Dadh
 22-Dino Shah
 23-Satt Puri
 24/1 Dalel Dero
 24/2 Dalel Dero
 25-Batho
 Bahawal Shah
 Bao
 Bello Lakhat
 Belo Madd
 Belo Marri
 Belo Mehrabpur
 Belop Nasri
 Bhiraro
 Chan Biar
 Chattan Shah
 Gohram Mari
 Golo Dahri
 Hala Wahar
 Jado Jono
 Jamal Keerio
 Khadhar
 Kot Dhingano
 Kumb Leema
 Lakha Jageer
 Lakha-1
 Lakha-2
 Lakhat
 Lal M Bheenjo
 Madd
 Morio Lakho
 Morri
 Munhar
 Naqqur
 Roomio
 Sabu Rahu
 Sukh Pur
 Sutiaro
 Tali
 Tharo Unar
 Tirchi
 Tirchi-2
 Torri
 Yakhtiar Khan

References

Sources

 Website of the Election Commission of Pakistan (Election Results National Assembly)
 The book Aeena Zila Nawabshah compiled and written by Muhammad Ayub Shad

 
Districts of Sindh
Memorials to Benazir Bhutto